Dionysodorus of Caunus (c. 250 BC – c. 190 BC) was an ancient Greek mathematician.

Life and work 
Little is known about the life of Dionysodorus. Pliny the Elder writes about a Dionysodorus who measured the earth's circumference, however he is probably the one from Pontus and different from the one from Caunus as Strabo differentiates between the two mathematicians.

Dionysodorus is remembered for solving the cubic equation by means of the intersection of a rectangular hyperbola and a parabola. Eutocius credits Dionysodorus with the method of cutting a sphere into a given ratio, as described by him. Heron mentions a work by Dionysauras entitled On the Tore, in which the volume of a torus is calculated and found to be equal to the area of the generating circle multiplied by the circumference of the circle created by tracing the center of the generating circle as it rotates about the torus's axis of revolution. Dionysodorus used Archimedes' methods to prove this result.

It is also likely that this Dionysodorus was the inventor of a conical sundial. Pliny's mentioning tells of an inscription placed on his tomb, addressed to the world above, stating that he had been to the centre of the earth and found it 42 thousand stadia distant. Pliny calls this a striking instance of Greek vanity; but this figure compares well with the modern measurement.

Citations and footnotes

References 
 T. L. Heath, A History of Greek Mathematics II (Oxford, 1921).
 Netz, Reviel. The Transformations of Mathematics in the Early Mediterranean World. Cambridge University Press, 2004. . Pags. 29-39.

External links 
 

250s BC births
190s BC deaths
Ancient Greek mathematicians
Ancient Greeks in Caria
3rd-century BC mathematicians
2nd-century BC mathematicians